The Haus der Technik was an exhibition hall in Königsberg, Germany, now Kaliningrad, Russia.

Constructed from 1924 to 1925 by Hanns Hopp along Waldburgstraße / Wallring between Tragheim and Tragheimsdorf, the brick hall was used to display machinery as part of the Ostmesse trade fair. Its massive hall was larger in size than even the Muscovite Hall in Königsberg Castle. The Nazis renamed it the "Schlageterhaus", after Albert Leo Schlageter, from 1933 to 1945.

The hall's roof was destroyed during World War II. The building and its vicinity were acquired by an investment company in 2004 and have been converted to commercial use in Kaliningrad.

References
 

1925 establishments in Germany
1945 disestablishments in Germany
Buildings and structures in Kaliningrad
Convention centres in Germany
Former buildings and structures in Königsberg
Cultural heritage monuments of regional significance in Kaliningrad Oblast